Catrin may refer to:

 Catrin ferch Owain Glyndŵr, one of the daughters of Margaret Hanmer and Owain Glyndŵr
 Katheryn of Berain, Catrin Tudor, known as 'Mother of Wales'
 "Catrin" (poem), a poem by Gillian Clarke, Welsh poet
 "El Catrin" is one of the images found in the Lotería game. In Mexican culture the term Catrin is used to describe a Dandy-like gentleman.

People with the given name Catrin:
 Catrin Finch, Welsh harpist born in Llanon, Ceredigion
 Catrin Lloyd-Bollard, American voice actor and stage actor known for voicing Olympia in the Pokémon anime series. 
 Catrin Nilsmark, Swedish golfer
 Catrin Lye, Castaway 2007 contestant
 Catrin Stewart, Welsh actress